School of Planning and Architecture, New Delhi (SPA New Delhi) is a higher education federal institute located in New Delhi, India specializing in education and research, and serving as the national center of excellence, in the fields of planning and architecture. The institute primarily offers undergraduate, postgraduate, doctoral and executive education programs. It forms part of the league with other two Schools of Planning and Architecture, namely SPA Bhopal and SPA Vijayawada established by the Government of India with the objective of providing quality Architecture and physical planning education.

Each SPA is autonomous and exercises independent control over its day-to-day operations. However, the administration of all SPAs and the overall strategy of SPAs is overseen by the SPA council. The SPA Council is headed by India's Minister of Human Resource Development and consists of the chairpersons and directors of all SPAs and senior officials from the MHRD.

History
The beginning of the School of Planning and Architecture, New Delhi dates back to the year 1941, as a Department of Architecture of the Delhi Polytechnic of Delhi University (now Delhi Technological University). In 1942, Walter Sykes George and his associates established the Department of Architecture as part of the Delhi Polytechnic in Kashmere Gate.  It was the first school for architects to be established in North India. 1959 it was merged with the School of Town and Country Planning (established in 1955 by the Government of India), renamed to its current name and affiliated to the University of Delhi. In 1979, recognizing its national and international eminence, the institute was granted Deemed University status. In 2008, Government of India established two more SPAs, namely SPA Bhopal and SPA Vijaywada. In 2014, Lok Sabha passed a bill to make all the three SPAs "centre of excellence" on the pattern of IITs and IIMs. It was named an "Institution of National Importance" under the SPA Act 2014.

Campus
The current SPA New Delhi campus is split in two blocks one each for Planning and Architecture. Both these blocks are housed near ITO in Indraprastha Estate in New Delhi. The girls hostel is located in the ITO campus itself and the boys hostel and residential campus is located in New Friends Colony, Maharani Bagh, Delhi.

As of July 2013 the final plans for the new campus in Vasant Kunj has been finalised.

Organisation and administration

Governance
The Director of the School is assisted by 5 Deans as follows :

 Dean - Academics
 Dean - Research
 Dean - Student Affairs
 Dean - Faculty Welfare
 Dean - Planning and Development

Each department of studies has a Departmental Research Committee and Head of the Department of Studies is its chairperson. Academic policy is decentralized to the extent that each department of studies has an Advisory Committee, which makes proposals on department related academic matters. Chairperson of the Board of Studies is Head of the Department.

Departments

The various Departments in the School are as follows :

 Department of Architecture
 Department of Urban Planning
 Department of Housing
 Department of Transport Planning
 Department of Landscape Architecture
 Department of Urban Design
 Department of Environmental Planning
 Department of Physical Planning
 Department of Regional Planning
 Department of Architectural Conservation
 Department of Industrial Design
 Department of Building Engineering and Management

Academics

Academic programmes
The School offers planning, architecture and design courses both at undergraduate and postgraduate levels. Admission to undergraduate programs in all SPAs is tied to the Entrance Examination, popularly known as JEE. Candidates who qualify admission via Joint Entrance Examination can apply for admission in B.Arch. (Bachelor of Architecture) and B.Plan. (Bachelor of Planning) courses in SPAs. Admission to most postgraduate courses in SPAs is granted through various interviews and Graduate Aptitude Test in Engineering.

While the Bachelor of Architecture course is one of the oldest in the country, highly successful Bachelor of Planning course was started in 1989. Besides, the school offers 10 postgraduate programmes along with the doctoral programmes run by all the departments of studies. Total strength of the students in session 2015-2016 was 1,189 of which 717 were undergraduate students and 428 were post graduates. Presently 44 students are pursuing Ph.D. programme in the School.

Recognition 
SPA New Delhi has a special status as an "Institutes of National Importance" under an act of Parliament, due to which the degrees provided by SPA need not be recognized by the AICTE. The JEE and GATE are important factors behind the success of SPA, as it enables the SPA to accept only a select group of meritorious students. This combination of success factors has led to the concept of the SPA Brand. Other factors that have contributed to the success of SPA are stringent faculty recruitment procedures and industry collaboration. The procedure for selection of faculty in SPA is stricter as compared to other colleges offering similar degrees.

Rankings

In 2020, SPA New Delhi was ranked 5th in architecture by the National Institutional Ranking Framework.

Student life

Halls of residence

The SPA was one of the first institutions to have mixed hostels for girls and boys, but this was closed in 1993, despite student protests. 
There are two hostels for students. The planning block of the institution offers residence to girls. The hostel complex in Taimoor Nagar is designed for both boys and girls.

Notable alumni

Arundhati Roy, writer
Baburam Bhattarai, 36th Prime Minister of Nepal
Eugene Pandala, Indian architect known for building with Environmental Sustainability
Gerard da Cunha, Indian architect of the famous Nrityagram
Hisila Yami, former Minister of Physical Planning, Government of Nepal
Raj Rewal, architect 
Revathi Kamath, pioneer of mud architecture in India

In popular culture
The movie In Which Annie Gives It Those Ones (1989) co-written by Arundhati Roy is based on the life of students of the college and was filmed at SPA.

See also
School of Planning and Architecture, Bhopal
School of Planning and Architecture, Vijayawada

References

External links
 

Universities and colleges in Delhi
School of Planning and Architecture
Educational institutions established in 1941
1941 establishments in India